Marco Olivieri (born 30 June 1999) is an Italian professional footballer who plays as a forward for Serie B club Perugia, on loan from Juventus.

Club career
Olivieri is a product of Empoli's youth setup, playing for their under-19 squad in the 2015–16 season. He made his first bench appearance for Empoli's senior squad on 5 August 2017, in a 2017–18 Coppa Italia game against Renate. On 26 August 2017, Olivieri joined Juventus on loan. He played for their under-19 squad in the 2017–18 UEFA Youth League.

The forward made his Serie C debut for Juventus U23 on 30 September 2018, in a game against Novara as an 83rd-minute substitute for Matheus Pereira. At the end of the season, Juventus redeemed the €1 million buying option they had secured when they loaned him.

He made his Serie A and senior club debut for Juventus on 30 June 2020, coming on as a late second-half substitute for Paulo Dybala in a 3–1 away win over Genoa. He made his Champions League debut on 7 August, coming on as a substitute for the injured Paulo Dybala in a 2–1 home win over Lyon in the second leg of the round of 16 of the competition; the result saw Juventus eliminated from the competition on away goals, following a 2–2 draw on aggregate.

On 9 September 2020 he returned to Empoli in Serie B on loan.

On 22 June 2021, he joined Lecce on loan.

On 29 January 2022, he moved on a 1.5-year loan to Perugia, with an option to buy and a conditional obligation to buy.

International career
Olivieri was first called up to represent his country in 2014, for Italy national under-16 football team friendlies. He represented the under-17 squad at the 2016 UEFA European Under-17 Championship, scoring one goal, as Italy did not advance from the group stage. Olivieri then represented the under-18, under-19, and under-20 squads, all in friendlies.

Style of play
A former centre-forward, tactically, Olivieri usually plays as a left winger, a position which allows him to cut inside and shoot on goal with his stronger right foot. He is known for his eye for goal, and also possesses a good physique, despite his relatively modest height of 1.77 m.

Career statistics

Honours
Juventus U23
 Coppa Italia Serie C: 2019–20

Juventus
 Serie A: 2019–20

Italy U20
 FIFA U-20 World Cup fourth place: 2019

References

External links
 

1999 births
People from Ascoli Piceno
Sportspeople from the Province of Ascoli Piceno
Living people
Italian footballers
Italy youth international footballers
Association football forwards
Empoli F.C. players
Juventus F.C. players
Juventus Next Gen players
U.S. Lecce players
A.C. Perugia Calcio players
Serie A players
Serie B players
Serie C players
Footballers from Marche